Guilford is a census-designated place (CDP) in Chenango County, New York, United States. The population was 362 at the 2010 census. It is located in the town of Guilford.

Geography
The Guilford CDP comprises the hamlets of Guilford and Guilford Center in the west-central part of the town of Guilford. It is located on County Road 35, which leads northwest  to Oxford and southeast  to Sidney.

Guilford Lake occupies the northwestern end of the CDP and drains to the east via Guilford Creek, which passes through both Guilford and Guilford Center on its way southeast to the Unadilla River.

Demographics

References

Census-designated places in New York (state)
Census-designated places in Chenango County, New York